Edo 2020 Sports Festival was the 20th edition of the Nigerian National Sports Festival, a biennial multi-sport event organized by the Federal Government of Nigeria through the National Sports Commission for athletes from the 36 States and the Federal Capital Territory of Nigeria.

History
The National Sports Festival was first held in 1973 in Lagos State. The festival has always been celebrated with the aim of foostering unity and harnessing talents in the different states of Nigeria.

The festival is also known to be called Nigerias version of the Olympic Games. The festival for 2020 was the 20th edition of the competition and it was hosted at the Samuel Ogbemudia Stadium in Benin City, Edo State.

Festival activities
The National Sport Festival tagged Asaba 2022 was scheduled to hold from April 4, 2020, to April 15, 2020.

The governor of Edo State, Godwin Obaseki, opened the festival by encouraging athletes to put in their best during the tournament.

The official Mascot for this year's event is Erin which means "strength" in the Edo language.

As part of the opening event, Nigerian musician Timi Dakolo performed one of his hit songs titled One Nation. More than 10,000 athletes are expected during the festival.

Host selection
Edo state was awarded the hosting right for the 20th edition after the 19th edition of the competition came to an end in Abuja. This was announced by the Minister of Sport, Barrister Solomon Dalung.

Tournament medal table
At the end of the 20th edition, team Delta topped the medal table winning 158 gold medal, 116 silver medals and 110 bronze medals.

Team Edo came second and this was closely followed by Team Bayelsa who came third at the end of the festival.

References

2020 in Nigerian sport
Sports competitions in Nigeria